The Juno Awards of 2011 honoured Canadian music industry achievements in the latter part of 2009 and in most of 2010. The awards were presented in Toronto, Ontario, Canada, during the weekend of 26 and 27 March 2011. A week of related events began on 21 March 2011. This occasion marked 40 years since the 1971 Juno Awards, the first year the ceremonies were conducted by that name.

The primary ceremony on 27 March was televised nationally by CTV. Deane Cameron, president of EMI Music Canada since 1988, was designated the 2011 recipient of the Walt Grealis Special Achievement Award. Shania Twain was inducted into the Canadian Music Hall of Fame. Neil Young was presented with the Allan Waters Humanitarian Award for his work in such causes as Farm Aid.

Drake received six nominations. Arcade Fire earned five nods. Broken Social Scene, Justin Bieber and Hedley each received four nominations. Johnny Reid and Sarah McLachlan each earned two nods. Die Mannequin and Neil Young received two nominations.

Events
Most awards were announced at a private gala dinner on 26 March 2011 at Exhibition Place's Allstream Centre. Rap musician and actor Drake hosted the primary awards ceremony from the Air Canada Centre the next evening.

A new trophy design was introduced for the 2011 awards, consisting of a laser engraving of Shirley Elford's Juno spiral figure encased within a transparent block. Elford had created individual trophies since the 2000 awards, but was unable to continue this work due to cancer.

Other events during the Juno week include:

 20–25 March: various presentations and workshops at the Ontario Science Centre
 20–26 March: various films related to Canadian musicians at TIFF Bell Lightbox
 21 March: Juno Hoops basketball game at Kerr Hall, Ryerson University, featuring musicians, sportspeople and other personalities as players
 22 March: Ovation classical concert at Roy Thomson Hall
 23 March: Songwriters Circle at Massey Hall, hosted by Johnny Reid, featuring Luke Doucet, Lynn Miles, Sylvia Tyson, Royal Wood;
 24 March: Juno Block Party at Pecaut Square, a concert in which selected Juno nominees perform;
 25 March: Juno Cup ice hockey game between NHL veterans and musicians at CNE Coliseum
 25–26 March: JunoFest series of concerts at multiple venues
 26 March: Juno Fan Fare at the MuchMusic location

Main ceremony performers
The following artists performed at the main ceremony:

Arcade Fire
Broken Social Scene
Chilly Gonzales
Chromeo
City and Colour*
Jim Cuddy*
Down with Webster
Feist (presenter)
Sarah Harmer*
Kevin Hearn*
Hedley
Greg Keelor*
Derek Miller*
Johnny Reid
Sarah McLachlan
Tokyo Police Club
Justin Rutledge*
Serena Ryder*
The Sadies*
Sarah Slean*

– * – these artists appeared in a tribute of the Junos' 40th anniversary

Nominees and winners
Nominations for the various award categories were announced on 1 February 2011. Most awards were announced at the private 26 March gala, with eight categories announced the following day on the main televised ceremony.

People

Juno Fan Choice Award
Winner: Justin Bieber

Other nominees:

Michael Bublé
Drake
Hedley
Johnny Reid

Artist of the Year
Winner: Neil Young

Other nominees:

Justin Bieber
Drake
Sarah McLachlan
Johnny Reid

Group of the Year
Winner: Arcade Fire

Other nominees:

Broken Social Scene
Down with Webster
Great Big Sea
Three Days Grace

New Artist of the Year
Winner: Meaghan Smith

Other nominees:

Bobby Bazini
Basia Bulat
Caribou
Hannah Georgas

New Group of the Year
Winner: Said the Whale

Other nominees:

Die Mannequin
Hollerado
Misteur Valaire
My Darkest Days

Jack Richardson Producer of the Year

Winner: Daniel Lanois, "Hitchhiker" (Neil Young, Le Noise); "I Believe in You" (Black Dub, Black Dub)

Other nominees:

 Arcade Fire (with Markus Dravs), "Ready To Start", "We Used To Wait" (Arcade Fire, The Suburbs)
 Gavin Brown and Sarah Harmer, "Captive", "New Loneliness" (Sarah Harmer, Oh Little Fire)
 David Foster, "Bring Me To Life" (Katherine Jenkins, Believe); "Secret" (Seal, Commitment)
 Brian Howes, "Cha-Ching", "Perfect" (Hedley, The Show Must Go)

Recording Engineer of the Year
Winner: Kevin Churko, "Let It Die", "Life Won’t Wait" (Ozzy Osbourne, Scream)

Other nominees:

 Lenny De Rose, "Captive", "Late Bloomer" (Sarah Harmer, Oh Little Fire)
 Mike Plotnikoff, "What Do You Got?" (Bon Jovi, Greatest Hits: The Ultimate Collection); "Break" (Three Days Grace, Life Starts Now)
 David Travers-Smith, "Cold Outside" (Ruth Moody, The Garden); "Vinicius" (Jayme Stone, Room of Wonders)
 Jeff Wolpert, "On A Bright May Morning" (Loreena McKennitt, The Wind That Shakes the Barley); "Midnight Train to Georgia" (David Clayton-Thomas, Soul Ballads)

Songwriter of the Year
Winner: Arcade Fire, "Ready To Start", "Sprawl II (Mountains Beyond Mountains)", "We Used To Wait"; all from The Suburbs

Other nominees:

 Drake, "Fireworks" (written with M. Samuels), "Over" (written with N. Shebib, M. Samuels, C. Kalla, A.Cook), "Show Me A Good Time" (written with K. West, J. Bhasker, E. Wilson); all from Thank Me Later
 Hannah Georgas, "Chit Chat", "The Deep End" (written with Robbie Driscoll), "Lovers Breakdown"; all from This Is Good
 Sarah McLachlan, "Forgiveness" (written with Pierre Marchand), "Illusions of Bliss", "Loving You Is Easy"; all from Laws of Illusion
 Royal Wood, "On Top of Your Love", "Tonight I Will Be Your Guide", "Waiting"; all from The Waiting

Albums

Album of the Year
Winner: The Suburbs, Arcade Fire

Other nominees:

My World 2.0, Justin Bieber
A Place Called Love, Johnny Reid
The Show Must Go, Hedley
Thank Me Later, Drake

Aboriginal Album of the Year
Winner: CerAmony, CerAmony

Other nominees:

 The Black Star, Joey Stylez
 Derek Miller with Double Trouble, Derek Miller
 The Great Unknown, Eagle & Hawk
 Vigilance, Little Hawk

Adult Alternative Album of the Year
Winner: Le Noise, Neil Young

Other nominees:

 Black Dub, Black Dub
 Oh Little Fire, Sarah Harmer
 Steel City Trawler. Luke Doucet and the White Falcon
 You I Wind Land and Sea, Justin Nozuka

Alternative Album of the Year
Winner: The Suburbs, Arcade Fire

Other nominees:

 Champ, Tokyo Police Club
 Les Chemins de verre, Karkwa
 Forgiveness Rock Record, Broken Social Scene
 Heartland, Owen Pallett

Blues Album of the Year

Winner: Everywhere West, Jim Byrnes

Other nominees:

 Bread and Buddha, Harry Manx
 It's a Long Road, The Johnny Max Band
 The Sojourners, The Sojourners
 Where's the Blues Taking Me, Fathead

Children's Album of the Year
Winner: Proud Like a Mountain, Peter Lenton

Other nominees:

 Encore, Gregg LeRock
 The Little Blue Doggy, Michelle Campagne
 Number 3 (album)|Number 3, The Kerplunks
 Power to the Little People, The Monkey Bunch

Classical Album of the Year (solo or chamber ensemble) 
Winner: Beethoven: Piano Trios Op. 70 No. 1, Ghost & No. 2: Op 11, Gryphon Trio

Other nominees:

 Anton Kuerti Schumann, Anton Kuerti
 Armenian Chamber Music, Amici Ensemble
 Bach: Six Suites for Solo Cello, Winona Zelenka
 Marc-André Hamelin - Études, Marc-André Hamelin

Classical Album of the Year (large ensemble) 
Winner: Mozart: Scott and Lara St. John/The Knights, Scott and Lara St. John

Other nominees:

 Arvo Pärt: Portrait, Angèle Dubeau and La Pietà
 Bonbons (album)|Bonbons, Les Violons du Roy under Bernard Labadie
 Chopin Piano Concertos, Janina Fialkowska and Vancouver Symphony Orchestra under Bramwell Tovey
 James Ehnes Plays Mendelssohn, James Ehnes

Classical Album of the Year (vocal or choral performance) 
Winner: Great Operatic Arias, Gerald Finley

Other nominees:

 Britten - Les Illuminations, Karina Gauvin
 Into Light, Musica intima
 Night and Dreams, Measha Brueggergosman
 Salsa baroque, Ensemble Caprice

Gospel Album of the Year|Contemporary Christian/Gospel Album of the Year 

Winner: Love & the Lack Thereof, Greg Sczebel

Other nominees:

 Clarity, Article One
 The Chase, Manafest
 Newworldson, Newworldson
 The Saving One, Starfield

Country Album of the Year
Winner: A Place Called Love, Johnny Reid

Other nominees:

 Day Job, Gord Bamford
 Love Rules, Carolyn Dawn Johnson
 Sunshine, Deric Ruttan
 Trail in Life, Dean Brody

Electronic Album of the Year
Winner: Swim, Caribou

Other nominees:

 Crystal Castles II, Crystal Castles
 Ivory Tower, Chilly Gonzales
 Latin, Holy Fuck
 Running High, Poirier

Francophone Album of the Year
Winner: Les Chemins de verre, Karkwa

Other nominees:

 Belmundo Regal, Radio Radio
 Brun, Bernard Adamus
 Nous, Daniel Bélanger
 Silence, Fred Pellerin

Instrumental Album of the Year
Winner: Continent & Western, Fond of Tigers

Other nominees:

 Rising Sun, The Souljazz Orchestra
 Room of Wonders, Jayme Stone
 Spirit Dance, David Braid and Canadian Brass
 Sundogs, Creaking Tree String Quartet

International Album of the Year
Winner: Teenage Dream, Katy Perry

Other nominees:

Animal, Ke$ha
Need You Now, Lady Antebellum
Recovery, Eminem
Speak Now, Taylor Swift

Contemporary Jazz Album of the Year
Winner: Treelines, Christine Jensen Jazz Orchestra

Other nominees:

 Big Sky, Chet Doxas
 Jerusalem Trilogy, Matt Herskowitz
 Next Exit, Kelly Jefferson Quartet
 Ricochet, Adrean Farrugia

Traditional Jazz Album of the Year
Winner: Our First Set, John MacLeod's Rex Hotel Orchestra

Other nominees:

 Drum Lore, Owen Howard
 Hieronymus, Félix Stüssi 5 and Ray Anderson
 Re: Visions, Works for Jazz Orchestra, Earl MacDonald
 Songbook Vol. 2, Kirk MacDonald Quartet

Vocal Jazz Album of the Year
Winner: Nina, Kellylee Evans

Other nominees:

 The Beat Goes On, Emilie-Claire Barlow
 Last Call, Jeff Healey
 Nikki, Nikki Yanofsky
 Tracing Light, Laila Biali

Pop Album of the Year
Winner: My World 2.0, Justin Bieber

Other nominees:

 Better in Time, Bobby Bazini
 Can't Keep a Secret, Faber Drive
 Laws of Illusion, Sarah McLachlan
 Time to Win, Vol. 1, Down with Webster

Rap Recording of the Year
Winner: TSOL, Shad

Other nominees:

 At Last, Eternia and MoSS
 Thank Me Later, Drake
 Treat of the Day, Ghettosocks
 Vaudeville, D-Sisive

Rock Album of the Year
Winner:  Vancouver, Matthew Good

Other nominees:

Bears, Mayors, Scraps & Bones, Cancer Bats
Fino + Bleed, Die Mannequin
Life Turns Electric, Finger Eleven
Population: Declining, Hail the Villain

Roots and Traditional Album of the Year (solo)
Winner: My Hands Are on Fire and Other Love Songs, Old Man Luedecke

Other nominees:

 The Early Widows, Justin Rutledge
 Fall For Beauty, Lynn Miles
 The Garden, Ruth Moody
 Love Songs for the Last Twenty, Del Barber

Roots and Traditional Album of the Year (group)
Winner: La part du feu, Le Vent du Nord

Other nominees:

 City City, Chic Gamine
 Girls from the North Country- Dala Live in Concert, Dala
 Sundogs, Creaking Tree String Quartet
 That's the State I'm In, The Marigolds

World Music Album of the Year (solo)
Winner: Aksil, Élage Diouf

Other nominees:

 Gakondo, Mighty Popo
 The Rumba Foundation, Jesse Cook
 Soy Panamericano, Roberto López Project
 Supermagique, Pacifika

Songs

Single of the Year
Winner: "Wavin' Flag", Young Artists for Haiti

Other nominees:

"Find Your Love", Drake
"Hallelujah (Vancouver Winter 2010)", k.d. lang
"Oh...Canada", Classified
"Perfect", Hedley

Classical Composition of the Year
Winner: "Duo For Violin And Piano", R. Murray Schafer (album, Wild Bird)

Other nominees:

 "Exaudi", Jocelyn Morlock (album, Into Light)
 "Lamentatio Jeremiae Prophetae", Peter-Anthony Togni (album, Lamentatio Jeremiae Prophetae)
 "Last Dance", Clark Ross (album, Piano Atlantica)
 "Piano Concerto, 3", Larysa Kuzmenko (album, Concerti)

Dance Recording of the Year
Winner: "Sofi Needs a Ladder", Deadmau5

Other nominees:

 Business Casual, Chromeo
 Fixin to Thrill, Dragonette
 "Stereo Love", Mia Martina and Edward Maya
 "Table Dancer", Keshia Chanté

R&B/Soul Recording of the Year
Winner: "Stars", Quanteisha

Other nominees:

 "Come True", Solitair feat. Kardinal Offishall
 Nightlife, Karl Wolf
 "So Much", Raghav with Kardinal Offishall
 "Test Drive", Keshia Chanté

Reggae Recording of the Year 
Winner: "Likkle But Mi Tallawah", Elaine Lil'Bit Sheppard

Other nominees:

 Brighter Days, Lyndon John X
 "Don't Wanna Go", Tonya P
 Million Chance, Tony Anthony
 System Shakedown, Dubmatix

Other

Music DVD of the Year

Winner: Rush: Beyond the Lighted Stage (Rush), Scot McFadyen, Sam Dunn, Pegi Cecconi, Shelley Nott, Noah Segal, John Virant

Other nominees:

 The Lost Tapes (Buck 65), Nick Blasko, Geoff McLean, Christopher Mills
 Tournée Mondiale Taking Chances Le Spectacle (Celine Dion), Jean Lamoureux, Julie Snyder
 This Movie Is Broken (Broken Social Scene), Bruce McDonald, Niv Fichman, Dany M. Chiasson, Brandi-Ann Milbradt, Howard Ng, Amy Paquette, Noah Segal, Austin Wong
 The Virtual Haydn, Tom Beghin, Martha De Francisco, Jeremy Tusz, Wieslaw Woszczyk

Recording Package of the Year

Winner: Elisabeth Chicoine, Jimmy Collins, Robyn Kotyk, Joe McKay, Justin Peroff, Charles Spearin: Forgiveness Rock Record (vinyl box set), Broken Social Scene

Other nominees:

 Gabriel Jones, Vincent Morisset, Caroline Robert: The Suburbs, Arcade Fire
 James Mejia: Mutant Message, By Divine Right
 Graeme Patterson: New Inheritors, Wintersleep
 Corri-Lynn Tetz: Cloak and Cipher, Land of Talk

Video of the Year

Winner: "Kyle Davison, Perfect", Hedley

Other nominees:

 "Chargez!", Ariel
 "Collect Call", Metric
 "Forced to Love", Broken Social Scene
 "Saint Veronika", Billy Talent

Compilation album
A compilation album featuring selected Juno nominees was released on 8 March 2011 by EMI Music Canada. Sales of the album support the CARAS music education charity MusiCounts. The artists and track listing is as follows:
 "Ready To Start", Arcade Fire
 "All To All", Broken Social Scene
 "Find Your Love", Drake
 "Baby", Justin Bieber with Ludacris
 "Hollywood", Michael Bublé
 "Perfect", Hedley
 "Oh...Canada", Classified
 "The Good Life", Three Days Grace
 "Your Man", Down with Webster
 "Porn Star Dancing" (rock version), My Darkest Days with Zakk Wylde
 "Camilo (The Magician)", Said the Whale
 "Take Back The Fear", Hail the Villain
 "Nothing But A Song", Great Big Sea
 "Let's Go Higher", Johnny Reid
 "Loving You Is Easy", Sarah McLachlan
 "Walk With Me", Neil Young
 "I Wonder", Bobby Bazini
 "Hallelujah" (new version), k.d. lang
 "Wavin' Flag", Young Artists For Haiti

See also
 Juno Awards of 2000, the most recent previous time the awards were held in Toronto

References

External links
 Juno Awards official site

2011
2011 music awards
2011 in Canadian music
Festivals in Toronto
March 2011 events in Canada
2011 in Toronto